Tinc is an open-source, self-routing, mesh networking protocol and software implementation used for compressed and encrypted virtual private networks. It was started in 1998 by Guus Sliepen, Ivo Timmermans, and Wessel Dankers, and released as a GPL-licensed project.

Platforms
Tinc is available on Linux, FreeBSD, OpenBSD, NetBSD, DragonFly BSD, Mac OS X, Microsoft Windows, Solaris, iOS (jailbroken only), Android with full support for IPv6.

Future goals
The authors of Tinc have goals of providing a platform that is secure, stable, reliable, scalable, easily configurable, and flexible.

Embedded technologies

Tinc uses OpenSSL or LibreSSL as the encryption library and gives the options of compressing communications with zlib for "best compression" or LZO for "fast compression".

Projects that use tinc

Freifunk has tinc enabled in their routers as of October 2006.
OpenWrt has an installable package for tinc.
OPNsense, an open source router and firewall distribution, has a plugin for Tinc
pfSense has an installable package in the 2.3 release.
Tomato variants Shibby and FreshTomato include Tinc support.
NYC Mesh uses tinc to connect parts of the mesh over the public internet that would be otherwise out of range.

See also

stunnel, encrypts any TCP connection (single port service) over SSL
OpenVPN, an open source SSL VPN solution
VTUN, an open source SSL VPN solution that can bridge Ethernet

References

External links

Protocol Documentation

Internet protocols
Routing protocols
Internet Protocol based network software
Virtual private networks
Mesh networking